The legislative districts of Misamis Oriental are the representations of the province of Misamis Oriental in the various national legislatures of the Philippines. The province is currently represented in the lower house of the Congress of the Philippines through its first and second congressional districts.

Camiguin and Cagayan de Oro last formed part of its representation in 1969 and 1972, respectively.

History 

Prior to gaining separate representation, most areas now under the jurisdiction of Misamis Oriental were represented under the former province of Misamis (1907–1931). Exceptions are territories which were annexed in 1921 from Bukidnon and thus formed part of the representation of the Department of Mindanao and Sulu from 1917 to 1922: Napaliran (annexed to Balingasag in 1921), Claveria (became a municipality in 1950), Lourdez (distributed between Alubijid, El Salvador, Initao, Manticao and Opol in 1955) and Lumbia (distributed between Cagayan de Oro and Opol in 1954).

The approval of Act No. 3537 on November 2, 1929, split the old Misamis Province into Misamis Occidental and Misamis Oriental, and provided each successor province a separate representative in the Philippine Assembly. The new province of Misamis Oriental first elected its own representative in the 1931 elections. The province also remained part of the eleventh senatorial district which elected two out of the 24-member upper house of the Philippine Legislature when senators were still elected from territory-based districts until 1935.

During the Second World War, the Province of Misamis Oriental sent two delegates to the National Assembly of the Japanese-sponsored Second Philippine Republic: one was the provincial governor (an ex officio member), while the other was elected through a provincial assembly of KALIBAPI members during the Japanese occupation of the Philippines. Upon the restoration of the Philippine Commonwealth in 1945 the province retained its pre-war lone congressional district.

Even after receiving their own city charters, Cagayan de Oro and Gingoog remained part of the representation of the Province of Misamis Oriental by virtue of Section 90 of Republic Act No. 521 (June 15, 1950) and Section 89 of Republic Act No. 2668 (June 18, 1960), respectively.

The passage of Republic Act No. 4669 on June 18, 1966, separated the sub-province of Camiguin from Misamis Oriental and constituted it into an independent province; per Section 4 of the said law, the incumbent representative for Misamis Oriental continued representing the new province until its separate representative was elected in the November 1969 elections.

Misamis Oriental was represented in the Interim Batasang Pambansa as part of Region X from 1978 to 1984. The province returned two representatives, elected at large, to the Regular Batasang Pambansa in 1984. Cagayan de Oro separately elected its own representative starting that year.

Under the new Constitution which was proclaimed on February 11, 1987, the province was reapportioned into two congressional districts; each elected its member to the restored House of Representatives starting that same year.

1st District 
City: Gingoog
Municipalities: Balingasag, Balingoan, Binuangan, Kinoguitan, Lagonglong, Magsaysay, Medina, Salay, Sugbongcogon, Talisayan
Population (2015): 376,271

Notes

2nd District 
City: El Salvador (became city 2007)
Municipalities: Alubijid, Claveria, Gitagum, Initao, Jasaan, Laguindingan, Libertad, Lugait, Manticao, Naawan, Opol, Tagoloan, Villanueva
Population (2015): 512,238

Lone District (defunct)

1931–1969 
includes the cities of Cagayan de Oro (chartered 1950) and Gingoog (chartered 1960), and the sub-province of Camiguin (established 1957)

Notes

1969–1972 
includes the chartered cities of Cagayan de Oro and Gingoog

At-Large (defunct)

1943–1944 
includes the present-day province of Camiguin and the highly urbanized city of Cagayan de Oro

1984–1986

See also 
Legislative districts of Misamis
Legislative district of Camiguin
Legislative district of Cagayan de Oro

References 

Misamis Oriental
Politics of Misamis Oriental